Amniataba is a genus of fish in the family Terapontidae, that includes three species, with two being found in Oceania, and one in the Western Central Pacific.

Species

 Amniataba affinis (Mees & Kailola, 1977) (tiger grunter)
 Amniataba caudavittata (Richardson, 1845) (yellowtail trumpeter)
 Amniataba percoides (Günther, 1864)  (barred grunter)

References 

Perciformes genera
Terapontidae